Sheyla Michelle Anagua Cardozo (born 20 November 1999) is a Bolivian footballer who plays as a midfielder for Mundo Futuro and the Bolivia women's national team.

Club career
Anagua has played for Mundo Futuro in Bolivia.

International career
Anagua made her senior debut for Bolivia on 21 February 2021 in a 0–3 friendly away loss to Ecuador.

References

1999 births
Living people
Bolivian women's footballers
Women's association football midfielders
Bolivia women's international footballers